Viscountess Weymouth is a title given to the wife of Viscount Weymouth (normally the son of the Marquess of Bath. The title has been held by a number of women, including:

Elizabeth Thynne, Viscountess Weymouth (c.1711-1729)
Louisa Thynne, Viscountess Weymouth (c.1712-1736)
Elizabeth Thynne, Marchioness of Bath (1735-1825)
Emma Thynn, Viscountess Weymouth (born 1986)